Ivan Marusic  (born 1965) is an Australian engineer and physicist. He is known for his work on turbulence at high Reynolds number, using both theoretical and experimental approaches.

He received his PhD in 1992 and a bachelor's degree in mechanical engineering in 1987 from the University of Melbourne. From 1998 to 2002 he was a faculty member at the University of Minnesota, USA, where he was a recipient of an NSF Career Award, Packard Fellowship in Science and Engineering and Taylor Career Development Award. He received an ARC Federation Fellowship in 2006, ARC Laureate Fellowship in 2012 and since 2014 is an elected Fellow of the Australian Academy of Science. In 2010 Marusic was elected a Fellow of the American Physical Society. He was awarded a 2016 APS Stanley Corrsin Award for fluid dynamics research. He was elected a Fellow of the Australian Academy of Technology and Engineering in 2021.

References

Living people
1965 births
Australian physicists
Australian engineers
Fellows of the Australian Academy of Science
Fellows of the American Physical Society
Fellows of the Australian Academy of Technological Sciences and Engineering